Raeburn C. Horne (October 7, 1896 – November 6, 1962) was a politician in the state of Florida. He served in the Florida House of Representatives in 1931 and 1957, as a Democrat, representing Madison County.

Horne was part of the Pork Chop Gang that liked to meet at his fish camp at Nutall Rise in Taylor County along the Aucilla River.

References

1962 deaths
1896 births
Democratic Party members of the Florida House of Representatives
People from Jasper, Florida
Pork Chop Gang
20th-century American politicians